The 2016 Big Ten Football Championship Game was played December 3, 2016 at Lucas Oil Stadium in Indianapolis, Indiana. It was the sixth annual Big Ten Football Championship Game to determine the 2016 champion of the Big Ten Conference.

The 2016 Big Ten Championship Game pitted the Wisconsin Badgers, champions of the West Division, who made its fourth appearance in six years in the conference title game, against the East Division champion Penn State Nittany Lions, who made their first-ever appearance in the conference championship game. Penn State and Ohio State had identical 8–1 conference records, but Penn State won the head-to-head tiebreaker over the Buckeyes.

History
The 2016 Championship Game would be the sixth in the Big Ten's 121-year history, and the third to feature the conference's East and West division alignment. Last season, the Big Ten Championship Game featured the Michigan State Spartans, champions of the East Division, and the Iowa Hawkeyes, champions of the West Division. Iowa made its first appearance in the conference championship game, while Michigan State made its third appearance (L in 2011, W in 2013). Michigan State defeated Iowa 16–13 to win its second Big Ten Championship in three years.

Other
For the third time in the championship's history, ESPN's College GameDay was on site prior to the game.

Legacy
In August 2020, the game was listed as #1 by BlackShoeDiaries.com on its Best Penn State Football Games of the Last Decade list.

In May 2022, the game was listed as one of twelve games considered as Penn State's best by the website StateCollege.com on its 12 Seasons on the Beat (and Counting): The Top 12 Penn State Games list.

Teams

Wisconsin Badgers

The Badgers started the season unranked, and opened vs the No. 5 LSU Tigers, whom they upset, 16–14, at Lambeau Field. The Badgers remained ranked the remainder of the season, peaking at No. 5 in both the AP (Week 12) and Coaches (Week 13) polls, and at No. 6 in the CFP rankings released on November 22 and November 29, 2016.

The Badgers went into the Championship game 10–2 (7–2 Big Ten), with both losses coming to Top 5 teams: No. 4 Michigan, who defeated Wisconsin 14–7; and No. 2
Ohio State, who defeated Wisconsin 30–23 in overtime.

Penn State Nittany Lions

The Nittany Lions started the season off 2–2 after losses to Pitt and No. 4 Michigan but finished the regular season on an 8-game winning streak as well as beating No. 2 Ohio State while averaging 35 points per game. They clinched the Big Ten East and a spot in the Big Ten Championship with a win and a Michigan loss to Ohio State. The Nittany Lions were led by sophomore duo quarterback Trace McSorley and 1,000+ yard rusher in Saquon Barkley and junior wide receiver Chris Godwin.

They finished the regular season 10–2 (8–1 Big Ten), a big improvement from the last two seasons under head coach James Franklin (finished 7–6 both seasons). Following Penn State's upset of No. 2 Ohio State, the Nittany Lions would be ranked No. 24 in the AP poll, their first appearance in the poll since December 4, 2011, where they were ranked No. 23 prior to their loss to No. 17 Houston in the TicketCity Bowl. The following week, following their 62–24 victory over Purdue, Penn State was ranked No. 23 in the Coaches poll, their first appearance in said poll since December 4, 2011. Furthermore, Penn State made its debut in the CFP's first ranking of the season on November 1, where they were placed at No. 12; throughout the remainder of the season, the Nittany Lions continued to climb, maxing out at No. 7/8 heading into the Big Ten Championship Game.

Game summary

Source:

Statistics

See also
List of Big Ten Conference football champions

References

Championship
Big Ten Football Championship Game
Penn State Nittany Lions football games
Wisconsin Badgers football games
December 2016 sports events in the United States
Big Ten Football Champ
2010s in Indianapolis